{{DISPLAYTITLE:C17H22N2O}}
The molecular formula C17H22N2O may refer to:

 4,4'-Bis(dimethylamino)benzhydrol
 Doxylamine, a sedative antihistamine
 5-MeO-DALT, or N,N-diallyl-5-methoxytryptamine

Molecular formulas